Goiás is a Native Brazilian name, used by unspecified tribesmen to refer to themselves, derived from gua iá, "one like us". 

The term may refer to:
 Goiás, a state in Brazil.
 Goiás, Goiás, a town in the state of Goiás.
 Goiás Esporte Clube, an association football club from the state of Goiás.

See also 
 Goia (disambiguation)
 Goya (disambiguation)